Chausa is a village and corresponding community development block in Buxar district, Bihar, India. It is located 11 km west of the district headquarters, Buxar, on the bank of the river Ganga. As of 2011, the population of the village of Chausa was 9,011, in 1,362 households, while the total block population was 103,670, in 15,817 households.

The area is famous as the site of the Battle of Chausa, in which the forces of Sher Shah Suri defeated Mughal emperor Humayun's army in 1539. It was also the site of discovery of the Chausa hoard, a set of 18 ancient Jain bronzes. According to the old records of Chausa we get to know that Chausa was established by Sakarwar Rajput of Kamsar region who adopted Islam in 1500ADs.

Battle of Chausa
The Battle of Chausa (25 June 1539) took place between Mughal Emperor Humayun and Sher Shah Suri (Sher Khan). In this battle Humayun got defeated.

Demographics

Chausa is an entirely rural block, with no major urban centres. The sex ratio of the block in 2011 was 916, lower than the Buxar district ratio of 922. The sex ratio was higher among the 0-6 age group, with 935 females for every 1000 males. Members of scheduled castes constituted 17.31% of the block's population, and members of scheduled tribes made up 1.39%. The literacy rate of the block was 71.27%, slightly above the district rate of 70.14%, with a 22.99% gender literacy gap between men (82.24%) and women (59.25%). Chausa block also had the highest literacy rate among scheduled castes populations (62.56%) among blocks in Buxar district.

Employment
A majority of workers in Chausa block were employed in agriculture in 2011, with 24.19% being cultivators who owned or leased their own land and another 52.68% being agricultural labourers who worked another person's land for wages. A further 4.72% were household industry workers, and the remaining 18.42% were other workers.

Transport
Chausa possesses permanent pucca roads connected to both national and state highways. The village also has access to railway transport. Direct trains are available from major cities of country. Chausa Railway Station, Barakalan Railway Station are the very nearby railway stations to Chausa. The distance from Buxar Railway station is 11 km and Patna Airport/Railway 138 km and from Varanasi airport 127 km.

Villages
Chausa block contains 82 villages, including Chausa itself. Of these, 57 are inhabited and 25 are uninhabited:

Nearby places
 Buxar
 Varanasi
 Patna
 Ghazipur

See also
Chausa Canal

References 

Cities and towns in Buxar district